"Freedom" is a song by German-based British dance-pop duo London Boys, which was released in 1991 as the second single from their second studio album Sweet Soul Music. The song was written and produced by Ralf René Maué. In the UK, the single fared at #54, better than the previous single "Chapel of Love" which peaked at #75.

Formats
7" single
"Freedom" - 3:54
"Freedom (Instrumental)" - 3:53

12" single
"Freedom (Eight-O-Eight Mix)" - 8:08
"Freedom (Radio Version)" - 3:54
"Freedom (Instrumental)" - 3:53

CD single
"Freedom (Radio Version)" - 3:54
"Freedom (Eight-O-Eight Mix)" - 8:08
"Freedom (Instrumental)" - 3:53

Chart performance

Personnel 
 Edem Ephraim: Vocals
 Dennis Fuller: Choreographer, backing vocals
 Ralf René Maué: Writer, producer

References

1991 singles
London Boys songs
Songs written by Ralf René Maué
1990 songs
East West Records singles
Teldec singles